The Valmont train depot is an abandoned station stop for the Union Pacific Railroad's Boulder Branch from Denver to Boulder, Colorado. It was originally built in 1890 in Valmont, Colorado to serve as a depot for the railroad's service on the Boulder Branch at milepost 24. Train numbers 515 and 516, the designated train numbers for the branch line, usually served this branch with the use of self-propelled railcars until the passenger service was discontinued in the 1960s.

References

Former Union Pacific Railroad stations in Colorado
Railway stations in the United States opened in 1890
Transportation buildings and structures in Boulder County, Colorado